Carl Nolte (born c. 1933) is an American journalist. He writes the "Native Son" column in the San Francisco Chronicle.

Personal life and education

Nolte was born and raised in San Francisco. When he was a child, he lived in the Potrero Hill neighborhood. He served in the United States Army on active duty in Korea. He later served in the Army Reserve.  While working for the San Francisco Chronicle he served as a war correspondent in the Persian Gulf War and in the invasion of Iraq.

Career

He started working at the San Francisco Chronicle on June 13, 1961. He has served as a writer and an editor. He was a war correspondent. For the newspaper, he has written about the SS Jeremiah O'Brien when it sailed to Europe as part of the D-Day anniversary, the Gulf War and the Invasion of Iraq. In 2010, he was awarded the Maritime Heritage Award by the San Francisco Maritime National Park Association.  In 2011, he was given the President's Medal for Public Service by the California Maritime Academy. In 2012, he was given an Award of Merit by the San Francisco Museum and Historical Society.  In 2016 he was given the honorary degree of Doctor of Humaine Letters. <San Francisco Chronicle, biography>

Bibliography

Nolte, Carl. The San Francisco Century: A City Rises from the Ruins of the 1906 Earthquake and Fire. San Francisco: San Francisco Chronicle (2005). 
Nolte, Carl. USS Pampanito: A Submarine and Her Crew. San Francisco: San Francisco Maritime National Park Association (2001). 
Sausalito Historical Society with contributions by Carl Nolte. Sausalito. Mount Pleasant: Arcadia Publishing (2005).

References
tra

External links
Nolte's "Native Son" column from the San Francisco Chronicle

American newspaper reporters and correspondents
San Francisco Chronicle people
Writers from San Francisco
United States Army reservists
American war correspondents
United States Army personnel of the Korean War